Dragon Blade is a 2015 Chinese historical action film written and directed by Daniel Lee starring Jackie Chan. In the film, Chan plays Huo An, the commander of the Protection Squad of the Western Regions during the Han Dynasty. Dragon Blade was released in IMAX 3D on 19 February 2015, the first day of the Chinese New Year holiday period. The film was released in the United States on 4 September 2015 by Lionsgate Premiere.

Plot
In northwest China, 48 BC (50 BC in the English version), a security, customs and peacekeeping company under Han China's current government called Silk Road Protection Squad is committed to stopping battles, customs clearing and peacekeeping on the Silk Road. Huo An (Jackie Chan), the captain, successfully averts a battle between Indians and Xiongnu whilst he inadvertantly disgraces the Xiongnu woman warrior. The squad returns to their home city where Huo An's gentle wife Xiuqing (Mika Wang) serves as a schoolteacher for orphans of multiple ethnicities. One day, the Protection Squad's commanders uncover evidence that someone in the Squad is corrupt after soldiers found bribes among the corpses of enemies they neutralised. Suspecting Huo An and his squad to be the culprits, the commanders sentence then to construction work at the Wild Geese Gate, a ruined fortress located on the fringes of the Western regions, run by a Turkic auxiliary commander and housing workers, peasants, and prisoners of various nomadic groups tasked with rebuilding the fort.

Not long after, Wild Geese Gate is threatened by an exhausted Roman legion, carrying with them a blind boy named Publius (Jozef Waite), youngest son of triumvir Marcus Licinius Crassus. The Wild Geese Gate commander tries to fight the Romans, only to be defeated. Huo An rides out to stop the Romans, leading to a duel between him and legionary commander Lucius (Cusack). The duel ends in a stalemate after discovering a coming sandstorm, and seeing Publius and some Roman soldiers collapse due to starvation. Huo An allows the Romans to enter the fortress and recover, despite the Wild Geese Gate commander's protests. The next day, the Romans help the workers in rebuilding the fortress using their superior engineering skills, boosting the morale and happiness of the inhabitants in the process. Huo An returns the favor by sending some of his men to assist Lucius's envoys in reaching the Parthian Empire. A celebration is later held and Huo An is made an honorary centurion by Publius himself.

Lucius reveals that he and Publius are fleeing from Publius's brother Tiberius (Brody), a sadistic and ruthless Roman who betrayed and murdered Crassus during the Battle of Carrhae, blinded Publius to become consul, and defied the peace treaty with the Parthians. Learning that Tiberius is marching with 100,000 soldiers from the soldiers that Huo An sent earlier, Huo An insists on helping Lucius stop Tiberius as he is a big threat to the Silk Road. Shortly after, Huo An leaves to gather reinforcements, only to find that his second-in-command, revealed to be the corrupt soldier, has sent soldiers to murder Xiuqing and attack Wild Geese Gate in an attempt to help Tiberius in his conquest of the Silk Road and become the Protection Squad's commanding prefect. Huo An saves his wife and the orphans with help from the Xiongnu, but his wife is mortally wounded when she tried to rescue one of the orphans. At her dying breath, Xiuqing convinces Huo An to protect the orphans. Meanwhile, Lucius is betrayed and imprisoned alongside his legionaries in the city of Kroran, where Tiberius and his legions are encamped. Lucius is brutally tortured by Tiberius while Publius and his tutor are forced to commit suicide.

After learning of Lucius and his legion's capture, Huo An and a few loyal soldiers from his squad and the Wild Geese Gate travel to Kroran to rescue them and liberate the Silk Road. Huo An's group incites an uprising that frees Lucius's soldiers while Huo An himself breaks into Lucius's cell to free him but to no avail. As Tiberius's soldiers arrive to apprehend Huo An, he is begged by Lucius to kill him so that he does not have to suffer a slow death. Huo An tearfully acquiesces before returning to help his comrades. As Huo An and Lucius's soldiers are routed, nomadic hordes arrive to help them in the fight against Tiberius and his legions. A battle ensues but despite their combined strength, the nomadic forces are unable to gain the upper hand and they suffer heavy casualties. Among the dead are members of Huo An's squad, the Wild Geese Gate commander and his translator, and the Xiongnu warriors. The battle's tide is soon turned when an army of Parthians, led by some of Lucius's soldiers sent earlier, arrive to avenge Crassus and restore peace between Rome and Parthia. Tiberius is persuaded by his generals to surrender but he stubbornly refuses. Huo An then challenges Tiberius to a fierce duel which ends with Tiberius killed.

After the battle, the Chinese emperor allows the Romans to establish their own city, naming it Regum, or Liqian in Chinese, upon hearing of their bravery. The Emperor also allows the surviving nomadic inhabitants of the Wild Geese Gate to join the Protection Squad with Huo An as their commander. Huo An and his men then honor their fallen comrades, especially Lucius, by relocating Wild Geese Gate's shrine to Regum. Thousands of years later, the city fades from collective memory until in the present day, a team of archaeologists stumble upon the site and uncover its ruins but upon learning of its tragic history via 3D reconstruction, the archeologists prefer to leave Regum be in peace.

Cast

Production

Filming
Principal photography for Dragon Blade started on 15 April 2014 in Hengdian, China with some battle scenes. The cast and crew encountered difficult filming conditions due to the heat, their heavy costume and long filming hours. Two days later, a press conference for Dragon Blade was held at the Beijing International Film Festival where star Jackie Chan and director Daniel Lee attended and announced the film to be released in IMAX 3D on 19 February 2015, the first day of the Chinese Lunar New Year. Aside from Hengdian, production took place in Dunhuang and the Gobi Desert.

The film was shot with a budget of US$65 million. The film was financed by Sparkle Roll Media Corporation, Huayi Brothers Media Corporation, Shanghai Film Group, Home Media & Entertainment Fund, Tencent Video and the Beijing Cultural Assets Chinese Film and Television Fund. A signing ceremony for the launching of Beijing Cultural Assets Chinese Film and Television Fund also occurred there as Dragon Blade is the first film to receive an investment from the fund. International distribution of the film outside of China was handled by Golden Network Asia.

Chan stated that he made the film to express a message of peace for the world.

Release

Box office
Dragon Blade was a commercial success in its native country, China. It opened Thursday, February 19 in China and grossed US$18.7 million on the opening day. Through Sunday, February 22, it had a 3-day opening weekend total of US$33 million, topping the Chinese box office (US$54.8 million from Thursday - Sunday) from 132,874 screenings and 8.14 million admissions. Through its opening week it earned US$72 million. The film fell to number three the following weekend, earning US$45.9 million (down 19%). As of March 15, 2015, Dragon Blade has earned US$120 million in China alone.

Critical response
Dragon Blade has received a mixed reception, but with praise for its large-scale battle sequences, production design, and mixing of styles from both Hollywood and East Asian cinema. On Rotten Tomatoes, the film has an approval rating of 36% based on reviews from 47 critics, with an average rating of 4.62/10. The site's consensus reads, "Dragon Blade is beautifully staged and choreographed, but between the battles, its talented cast is overwhelmed by a dull story and choppy editing." On Metacritic the film has a weighted average score of 41 out of 100 based on reviews from 12 critics, indicating "mixed or average reviews".

Varietys Maggie Lee applauded the film for its overall technical details and concluded it to be "a colossal entertainment with solid technique and terrific storytelling smarts". Clarence Tsui of The Hollywood Reporter complimented Dragon Blade for its filmmaking quality and screenplay for a primarily mainland Chinese production.

IGN awarded it a score of 6 out of 10, saying "The story is rubbish, but Dragon Blade has some cool fight scenes thanks to Jackie Chan's action direction." In a negative review, Gabriel Chong from MovieXclusive.com panned Dragon Blade as being "utterly awful in every respect", criticizing the performances of the starring cast and inconsistent changes in tone. He writes: "Indeed, Dragon Blade is a hot mess and a spectacular misfire, not just by its star but also by its director, and if anything, further confirms that the once-promising careers of Hollywood stars John Cusack and Adrien Brody are going the way of Nicolas Cage".

Indian media gave overwhelmingly negative review on the film. Claiming it to be "a Chinese propagandist film", The Hindu's Venky Vembu criticized the film's lack of subtle messages and disapproved of the characterizations, writing: "I watched this film in 3D, but given the two-dimensional nature of the cardboard characters, I don't think the third D would have vastly enhanced my viewing experience." IANS also labeled the film as "Chinese torture", but did commend the film for its action choreography and Jackie Chan's performance as the Chinese General Huo An: "With ample footage in action and emotional scenes, [Huo An] is one of the best characters Chan has portrayed in recent years."

Historical basis
Marcus Licinius Crassus invaded Parthia in 53 BC, but most of his entire army was destroyed. The historian Homer H. Dubs speculated in 1941 that Roman prisoners of war who were transferred to the eastern border of the Parthian empire might later have clashed with Han troops there. Similar claims, and even a Roman force defecting to China, have been made since. These include a supposed Roman town near modern Liqian. But most historians do not accept this.

The first undisputed contact was much later, in 161 AD. An embassy from Roman Emperor Antoninus Pius or his successor Marcus Aurelius reached the Chinese Emperor Huan of Han at Luoyang.

See also
Daqin (ancient Chinese name for the Roman Empire)
Jackie Chan filmography
Sino-Roman relations
The Malay Chronicles: Bloodlines
The Great Wall, a film about a group of mercenary soldiers from Europe who wind up in China during the Northern Song Dynasty

References

External links

2010s historical action films
2015 3D films
2015 films
Chinese 3D films
Chinese action adventure films
Chinese historical action films
Chinese war films
Fiction set in the Roman Empire
Films directed by Daniel Lee
Films set in China
Films set in the 1st century BC
Films shot in China
Historical action films
History of the foreign relations of China
Hong Kong 3D films
Hong Kong historical action films
IMAX films
Latin-language films
Silk Road
Sparkle Roll Media films
2010s English-language films
2010s Mandarin-language films
2010s Hong Kong films